Erich Händel (24 March 1909 – 10 September 1943) was a German racing cyclist. He rode in the 1935 Tour de France.

References

External links
 

1909 births
1943 deaths
German male cyclists
German military personnel killed in World War II
People from Eisenach
Cyclists from Thuringia